Inferior mesenteric can refer to:
 Inferior mesenteric artery
 Inferior mesenteric vein
 Inferior mesenteric lymph nodes
 Inferior mesenteric plexus